The High Performance Programme is an initiative from the International Cricket Council to bridge the gap between Test and non-Test nations. The programme was launched in 2001 with the aim of preparing the top Associate Member teams for the 2003 Cricket World Cup. Following the tournament the programme continued to run, attempting to close the gap between Associate Members and Full Members. 

In 2006/2007, the six Associate Members who had qualified for the 2007 World Cup were taken on by the programme, given extra funding, regular training sessions at the ICC Global Cricket Academy and additional opportunities to practice against top opposition. These countries were Kenya, Canada, Bermuda, The Netherlands, Scotland and Ireland.

As of April 2007, both Denmark and Namibia are part of the programme. They were joined by Argentina and Uganda
in June after the teams made the final of the 2007 ICC World Cricket League Division Three.

References

External links
Gatorade ICC High Performance Programme
Cricinfo on the HPP

International Cricket Council